Sir James Lucas Yeo,  (7 October 1782 – 21 August 1818) was a British naval commander who served in the War of 1812. Born in Southampton, he joined the Royal Navy at the age of 10 and saw his first action in the Adriatic Sea. He distinguished himself in combat multiple times, most notably during the Portuguese conquest of French Guiana, earning knighthoods in the Portuguese Order of Aviz and the British Order of the Bath. He was given command of the frigate , in 1812, but his ship was wrecked in the Bahamas although he was acquitted of blame for its loss. Yeo was then given command of the squadron on Lake Ontario and commanded it during several engagements with the Americans.

Service history

Early life and career
Yeo was born in Southampton, England on 7 October 1782 to a naval victualling agent. Yeo was sent to an academy near Winchester for his formal education. Yeo joined the Royal Navy as a midshipman aboard  at the age of 10, thanks to his patron, Admiral Phillips Crosby. In 1796, he was made acting-lieutenant and placed in command of the 16-gun sloop . He was made lieutenant permanently on 20 February 1797. The vessel was deployed to the West Indies, where Yeo contracted Yellow fever and was ordered home to England to convalesce in 1798. By 1802, Yeo was first lieutenant aboard  in the Adriatic Sea. He distinguished himself during the siege of Cesenatico in 1800, when thirteen merchant vessels were burned or sunk. Following the Peace of Amiens in 1802, Yeo was demoted to half-pay.

Napoleonic Wars
Once war began again between Britain and France in 1805, Yeo became first lieutenant of the frigate . The frigate was patrolling off the northwest coast of Spain when Loires commanding officer, Captain F.L. Maitland, chose to attack shipping in Muros Bay, Spain. Lieutenant Yeo led fifty men ashore to attack a shore battery that was firing on the frigate. Once there, they found a second, more powerful emplacement and captured that one too. During the battle, Yeo was stabbed with a bayonet. The Spanish suffered over forty casualties in the engagement, the British six. Loire captured three vessels at Muros Bay including the 22-gun corvette .     As a reward, he was promoted to commander on 21 June and given the command of the captured Confiance, which had been taken into Royal Navy service.

In 1807, Confiance was part of Admiral Sidney Smith's fleet off Portugal. Confiance transported Percy Smythe, 6th Viscount Strangford to Lisbon to negotiate an alliance with Britain. Lord Strangford also negotiated the passage of the Portuguese Prince Regent Dom João and the Portuguese royal family to Brazil. Yeo was ordered by Admiral Smith to bring word of Strangford's success to Britain, an honour that led Yeo being named to the list of post-captains. Due to his rank, Confiance was reclassified as a post-ship. The following year, Confiance was part of Smith's fleet stationed off Brazil.

Yeo was ordered by Smith to bring dispatches to a Portuguese general from whom he learned of French privateers based at Cayenne, French Guiana. On 6 January 1809, he took command of a small force consisting of Confiance, two Portuguese brigs, and 550 Portuguese soldiers. With them he captured Cayenne, a fortified position of two hundred guns, and took a thousand prisoners. The conquest of French Guiana would remove the French from their last South American colony. During the operation, Yeo was among the many British who became sick. In 1810, he was knighted for his services at Cayenne, both by the Portuguese who decreed him a member of the Order of Aviz and the British, who decreed him a knight commander of the Order of the Bath and was given his own coat-of-arms. Yeo was the first Protestant to be made a member of the Order of Aviz.

In 1811 Yeo was given command of the frigate . The frigate was ordered to Jamaica where it joined the fleet of Vice Admiral Charles Stirling. In 1812, he was stationed in the Bahamas. There he captured the privateer Heureuse Réunion, a brig and a corvette in the action of 3 February 1812, and the American brig  in November 1812. However, shortly afterwards Southampton and Vixen were wrecked in the Crooked Island passage, although there were no deaths. As was customary in the case of the loss of a ship from any cause, Yeo was court martialled, but the court accepted that the reef on which he was wrecked was not charted, nor were the local currents documented, and Yeo was exonerated.

War of 1812
The importance of the naval warfare on the Great Lakes raised "The Lakes Service" to the status of a Flag Command and Kingston was the Commodore's headquarters. Yeo was sent to Canada in 1813 aboard  to command the British naval forces in the Great Lakes. He was appointed commodore of the fleet on Lake Ontario. Sir James's use of his small navy was always determined and skillful, but he was hampered by a lack of cooperation from the British army. The commander of these forces, Sir George Prevost, failed to follow up key advances made by Sir James at Sackett's Harbour and elsewhere that might have resulted in major British victories. On the whole, historians regard the war on Lake Ontario as having been a draw. During 1814 both Yeo and Isaac Chauncey, the American commander, tried to out build the other. Yeo captured Oswego, New York and then blockaded Sacketts Harbour on 6 May 1814, when reinforced by two frigates built on Point Frederick. The Americans also had two first line men-o'-war on the stocks.

After the British-American War, Yeo held important commands on the West African and Caribbean stations, but saw no further action. He died in 1818 at the age of 35, while returning from Jamaica to England.

Legacy

The Yeo Hall at the Royal Military College of Canada in Kingston, Ontario was named in his honour in 1936. This multifunctional building houses the Cadet Dining Hall and the Cadet Mess. The barber and Canadian Forces Exchange System (CANEX) are located in the basement.
A plaque erected by the Historic Sites and Monuments Board of Canada at the Royal Military College of Canada states "Born in Southampton, England, Yeo entered the British Navy, served throughout the Napoleonic Wars and won rapid promotion by his ability. In 1813, already a Commodore, he came to Canada to command British forces on the Great Lakes. Yeo successfully blockaded the American fleet in Sackett's Harbour for some months and subsequently commanded the naval forces at the capture of Oswego in 1814. Returning to England after the war he was posted to the West African Coast and died at sea while returning from that tour of duty."

Yeo was one of the actual historical officers on whom C. S. Forester modeled his fictional naval hero Horatio Hornblower. Forester briefly mentions him in the 1946 novel Lord Hornblower. The opening scene is a church service for members of the Order of the Bath, attended by a number of prominent historical naval officers, including Yeo. Although the novel is set in 1813, when Yeo was in Canada and before he became a Knight of the Bath.

Citations

Sources

External links
 Biography of James Lucas Yeo, Commander of the Great Lakes

1782 births
1818 deaths
Royal Navy personnel of the French Revolutionary Wars
Royal Navy personnel of the Napoleonic Wars
Royal Navy personnel of the War of 1812
Knights Commander of the Order of the Bath
Knights Bachelor
Commanders of the Order of Aviz
Royal Navy officers
Military personnel from Southampton
Naval history of Canada
Persons of National Historic Significance (Canada)
British people of the War of 1812
British military personnel of the War of 1812